Piz Badus or Six Madun is a mountain in the Lepontine Alps, lying on the border between the cantons of Uri and Graubünden.

In its northwestern face, which is the Graubünden side, lies Tomasee, source of the Anterior Rhine. 
It is possible to reach the lake on a path from Oberalp Pass, suitable for most walkers although still a mountain trail.

References

External links
 Oberalpstock on Summitpost
 Piz Badus on Hikr

Mountains of the Alps
Alpine three-thousanders
Alpine Rhine basin
Mountains of Graubünden
Mountains of the canton of Uri
Graubünden–Uri border
Lepontine Alps
Mountains of Switzerland
Two-thousanders of Switzerland
Andermatt
Tujetsch